These are the results of the men's C-1 slalom competition in canoeing at the 2000 Summer Olympics. The C-1 (canoe single) event is raced by one-man canoes through a whitewater course. The venue for the 2000 Olympic competition was in Penrith.

Medalists

Results

Qualifying
The 16 competitors each took two runs through the whitewater slalom course on 17 September. The combined score of both runs counted for the event with the top 12 advancing to the final round the following day.

Final
The 12 competitors each took two runs through the whitewater slalom course on 18 September. The combined score of both runs counted for the event.

References

2000 Summer Olympics Canoe slalom results. 
Sports-reference.com 2000 men's slalom C-1 results
Wallechinsky, David and Jaime Loucky (2008). "Canoeing: Men's Canadian Slalom Singles". In The Complete Book of the Olympics: 2008 Edition. London: Aurum Press Limited. pp. 486–7.

Men's Slalom C-1
Men's events at the 2000 Summer Olympics